3152 CT is an extremely toxic bisquaternary carbamate with powerful anticholinesterase action.

See also
EA-3966
EA-3990
EA-4056
T-1123

References

Carbamate nerve agents
Acetylcholinesterase inhibitors
Quaternary ammonium compounds
Phenol esters
Phenol ethers
Iodides